AP-3 complex subunit beta-1 is a protein that in humans is encoded by the AP3B1 gene.

Function 

This gene encodes a protein that may play a role in organelle biogenesis associated with melanosomes, platelet dense granules, and lysosomes. The encoded protein is part of the heterotetrameric AP-3 protein complex which interacts with the scaffolding protein clathrin. Mutations in this gene are associated with Hermansky–Pudlak syndrome type 2.

Interactions 

AP3B1 has been shown to interact with AP3S2.

References

External links 
  GeneReviews/NCBI/NIH/UW entry on Hermansky-Pudlak Syndrome

Further reading